Revsnes may refer to:

Places
Revsnes Island, an island off the coast of Antarctica
Revsnes, Troms, a village in Kvæfjord municipality in Troms county, Norway
Revsnes, Trøndelag, a village in Åfjord municipality in Trøndelag county, Norway
Revsnes, an old spelling of the village of Räfsnäs in Uppland, Sweden

See also
Algot Magnuson of Revsnes, a medieval Swedish noble